The 1922 Maine gubernatorial election took place on September 11, 1922.

Incumbent Republican Governor Percival P. Baxter succeeded to the Governorship in 1921 when his predecessor Frederic Hale Parkhurst died just 26 days into his term. Baxter was re-elected to a second term in office, defeating Democratic candidate William Robinson Pattangall.

Results

Notes

References

Gubernatorial
1922
Maine
September 1922 events